Magdi El Gallad (Egyptian: مجدى الجلاد; born 1964) is an Egyptian journalist.

Career
Gallad started his career as an investigative journalist for Al-Ahram. He is the founding editor of Al Watan newspaper. Before that, he was the editor-in-chief of the independent daily newspaper Al-Masry Al-Youm, and its sister English-language website, The Independent.

References

External links
Staff page at"The Independent"

1964 births
Living people
Cairo University alumni
Egyptian journalists